Cetkovice is a municipality and village in Blansko District in the South Moravian Region of the Czech Republic. It has about 800 inhabitants.

History
The first written mention of Cetkovice is from 1160.

References

Villages in Blansko District